The Fagalele Boys School, in Leone, American Samoa, is a historic building that was listed on the U.S. National Register of Historic Places in 1972.  It is a church school built by the London Missionary Society, perhaps as early as 1850–1856, but before 1900.  It was the first secondary school in what is now American Samoa, and it perhaps is the oldest surviving building on Tutuila Island.

It is a U-shaped building fitting within an  rectangle, apparently built of reinforced concrete or of rocks with a cement-plaster exterior.

See also
National Register of Historic Places listings in American Samoa

References

Schools in American Samoa
Tutuila
Buildings and structures on the National Register of Historic Places in American Samoa
School buildings on the National Register of Historic Places